Town and Country, or Which is Best? is an 1807 play by English playwright Thomas Morton.  It was regularly performed in England and America during the 19th century.

Background

The play debuted at Covent Garden in London on 10 March 1807.  Morton obtained a payment of £1,000 from theatre manager Thomas Harris for the script regardless of whether the play was a success, which was a notable sum for its time.   John Philip Kemble played the role of Reuben Glenroy and Charles Kemble filled the role of Plastic.  Edmund Kean later played the lead role of Reuben Glenroy to great success.

  The play was first performed in the United States in New York City on 2 November 1807 at the Park Theatre, with Thomas A. Cooper as Reuben Glenroy and Ellen Darley as Rosalie Somers.

Legacy

After Morton's death in 1838, The Gentleman's Magazine commented "Mr. Harris was well regarded for his liberality" in paying Morton £1,000 for the play, because "it is one of the stock pieces of every theatre in the kingdom."  However, it has also been said that Town and Country was "among the least successful productions" of Morton, but that John Kemble's acting in the role of Reuben Glenroy "is supposed to have saved the piece."  T. Allston Brown's 1902 history of the New York stage shows the play being performed in the 1850s and 1860s, though it was revived at Wallack's Theatre as late as 1888.

A much later commentator referred to the "long popular" play as "a rather inane play that lived, I believe, because of the fondness of actors of the Kemble school for the character of Reuben Glenroy."  In addition to John Kemble and Edmund Kean, well-known actors who played Reuben Glenroy include Thomas Apthorpe Cooper (New York debut in 1807), Charles Kean (son of Edmund), Junius Brutus Booth, Thomas S. Hamblin, James William Wallack, Lester Wallack, James Edward Murdoch, and George Vandenhoff.

Original London cast (10 March 1807)
Plastic by Charles Kemble
Trot by Mr. Blanchard
Cosey by Mr. Fawcett
Rev. Owen Glenroy by Mr. Murray
Reuben Glenroy by John Philip Kemble
Captain Glenroy by Mr. Brunton
Hawbuck by Mr. Emery
Hon. Mrs. Glenroy by Mrs. Glover
Rosalie Somers by Miss Brunton
Mrs. Trot by Mrs. Mattocks
Mrs. Moreen by Mrs. Davenport

Original New York cast (2 November 1807)
Reuben Glenroy by Thomas Apthorpe Cooper
Rev. O. Glenroy by Mr. Tyler
Capt. Glenroy by Mr. Claude
Plastic by Mr. Darley
Cosey by Mr. Twaits
Trott by Ms. Harwood
Hawbuck by Mr. Comer
Mrs. Glenroy by Mrs. Turner
Rosalie Somers by Mrs. Darley (Ellen Darley)
Mrs. Trott by Mrs. Oldmixon (Georgina George Oldmixon)
Mrs. Moreen by Mrs. Simpson
Taffline by Mrs. Claude

References

External links

 Town and Country, full play, "as performed at the Theatre-Royal, Covent-Garden" (London 1807)
 Town and Country, full play, "as performed at the Theatres-Royal, Drury-Lane and Covent-Garden" (London 1815)
 Town and Country, full play, "as performed at the Philadelphia Theatre" (Philadelphia 1827) 
 Town and Country, full play, with remarks by D--G George Daniel(1860)
 Town and Country, full play (London 1882)
 Sketch of actress Maria Horn (1811-1887) in role of Rosalie Summers

1807 plays
Plays by Thomas Morton
West End plays
Comedy plays